Anthony Alix (born December 8, 1986) is a professional Canadian football placekicker and punter for the BC Lions of the Canadian Football League.

Early years
Alix played CIS football for the St. Francis Xavier X-Men.

Professional football

Toronto Argonauts
Alix signed as a free agent with the Toronto Argonauts on June 2, 2012. Alix dressed in 3 games that season for the Argonauts, recording stats in 2 of the 3 games. In 2012, Alix made 2 of 3 field goals, punted 3 times for a total of 93 yards, 1 point after conversion, and 3 kickoffs for a total of 171 yards. The Argonauts would go on to win the 100th Grey Cup, though Alix did not dress for any of the team's playoff games.  He was released by the Argonauts on June 17, 2013.

Ottawa RedBlacks
On May 30, 2015, Alix signed with the Ottawa Redblacks. In 6 games with the Redblacks, Alix punted 37 times for 1,569 yards for an average of 42.6 yards. Alix was released by the Redblacks on August 18, 2015.

Toronto Argonauts
On October 1, 2015, Alix was re-signed by the Argonauts. He played in two games for the Argos before being released in the following offseason.

BC Lions
On February 21, 2019, it was announced that Alix had signed with the BC Lions.

References

External links
BC Lions profile
CFL profile page
Toronto Argonauts page
 

1986 births
Living people
St. Francis Xavier X-Men football players
Ottawa Redblacks players
Toronto Argonauts players
BC Lions players
Canadian football placekickers
Canadian football punters
Players of Canadian football from Quebec
World Games gold medalists
Competitors at the 2017 World Games